The 1998–99 UCLA Bruins men's basketball team represented the University of California, Los Angeles in the 1998–99 NCAA Division I men's basketball season.  The team finished 3rd in the conference.  The Bruins competed in the 1999 NCAA Division I men's basketball tournament, losing to the Detroit Titans in the round of 64.  This was the third season for head coach Steve Lavin.

Roster

Schedule

|-
!colspan=9 style=|Exhibition

|-
!colspan=9 style=|Regular Season

|-
!colspan=9 style=| NCAA tournament

Source

1999 NBA draft
Baron Davis was drafted third overall by the Charlotte Hornets in the 1999 NBA draft.

References

UCLA Bruins
UCLA Bruins men's basketball seasons
NCAA
NCAA
Ucla